Max Pucher is an Austrian businessman, conspiracy theorist and racing driver currently participating in the World Rallycross Championship. He is the owner and team principal of MJP Racing Team Austria.

Racing record

Complete FIA World Rallycross Championship results

Supercar

Complete FIA European Rallycross Championship results

Supercar

Criticism 
Since June 2021, Max Pucher appeared in an Austrian, political far right alternative media format, auf1 tv. While himself expressing views as climate change denial, denial of the death toll of the COVID-19 pandemic and general unscientific and pseudo-scientific views on modern science, the online tv station itself also propagates other extremist views as hate speech against minorities, sexism or conspiracy theories. Auf1 tv is managed by Stefan Magnet, previously active in the Neo-Nazism group Bund freier Jugend and who was taken into investigative custody and prosecuted by Austrian authorities based on the Prohibition Act 1947. Max Pucher expressed an active cooperation and involvement with Stefan Magnet in his initial appearance on auf1 tv.

Since early 2022, Max Pucher acts as the president of the political union Union Souveränität with strong ideological ties to the Querdenker movement. In this role, Max Pucher, expresses conspiracy theories and other right winged views as climate change denial and anti-migration policies.

External links

Living people
Austrian racing drivers
European Rallycross Championship drivers
World Rallycross Championship drivers
1954 births